Miguel Ángel Garduño Pérez (born April 26, 1991), known as Miguel Garduño, is a professional Mexican association football player who last played for Loudoun United FC in the USL Championship.

Career 
Miguel joined Loudoun United on September 24, 2019.

References

External links
 
 

1991 births
Living people
Footballers from the State of Mexico
Association football defenders
C.F. Mérida footballers
Dorados de Sinaloa footballers
Atlético Reynosa footballers
Las Vegas Lights FC players
Liga MX players
Mexican expatriate footballers
Expatriate soccer players in the United States
Mexican expatriate sportspeople in the United States
USL Championship players
National Premier Soccer League players
El Farolito Soccer Club players
Loudoun United FC players
Mexican footballers